Georg Müller may refer to:
 Georg Müller (explorer) (1790–1826), Dutch engineer and explorer
 George Müller (1805–1898), Christian evangelist and orphanage director
 Georg Müller (agricultural scientist) (1917–2004), German agricultural scientist
 Georg Elias Müller (1850–1934), German experimental psychologist
 Georg Müller (Catholic bishop) (born 1951), bishop of Trondheim
 Georg Wilhelm Ferdinand Müller (1806-1875), German book publisher
 Georg Alexander von Müller (1854–1940), German Navy Admiral
 Georg Mueller (sculptor) (1880–1952), German sculptor of the Munich Secession
 , Estonian/German clergyman and literary figure